Orictites costulipennis is a species of ground beetle in the family Carabidae, found in Indomalaya.

References

Scaritinae
Beetles described in 1892